The Clarkson Golden Knights women's ice hockey program represented Clarkson University during the 2018–19 NCAA Division I women's ice hockey season. The Golden Knights entered the season as the defending national champions as well as the ECAC regular season and tournament champions. They also entered the season as the top-ranked team in both the USCHO.com and the USA Today/USA Hockey Magazine polls for the second time.

During the season, the Golden Knights participated in the first NCAA women's ice hockey games outside the United States when they traveled to Belfast for a two-game series with Northeastern.

Offseason

Recruiting

Roster

Standings

Schedule

|-
!colspan=12 style=""| Regular Season

|-
!colspan=12 style=""| ECAC Hockey Tournament

|-
!colspan=12 style=""| NCAA Tournament

Awards and honors

Loren Gabel, Patty Kazmaier Award winner

References

Clarkson
Clarkson Golden Knights women's ice hockey seasons
NCAA women's ice hockey Frozen Four seasons